Edward Alfred Skinner (18 January 1847 – 10 February 1919) is an English first-class cricketer active 1871–81 who played for Surrey. He was born in Mitcham and died in Brighton.

References

1847 births
1919 deaths
English cricketers
Surrey cricketers